Aranmula Kannadi, meaning the Aranmula mirror, is a handmade, metal-alloy, first surface mirror made in Aranmula, a small town in Pathanamthitta, today's Kerala, India.

Description 
Unlike normal "silvered" glass mirrors, it is a metal-alloy mirror or first surface mirror or front surface reflection mirror, which eliminates secondary reflections and aberrations typical of back surface mirrors. They are produced by one extended family in Aranmula. The exact metals used in the alloy are maintained as family secrets; metallurgists suggest that the alloy is a mix of copper and tin, so a type of speculum metal.  It is polished for several days to achieve the mirror's reflective surface. The polishing is done using an abrasive paste made by mixing rice bran with oil extracted from seeds of maroṭṭi (Hydnocarpus pentandrus).

Cultural significance 
According to legend, centuries ago the royal chief brought eight families of temple artisans and craftsmen from Tirunelveli district in Tamil Nadu to Aranmula to create the mirrors in the temple.

These unique mirrors are the result of then Kerala's rich cultural and metallurgical traditions. They have great historical and cultural value, and are thought to bring good luck. The mirrors are considered one of the eight auspicious items or "" used in the entry of a bride at a wedding venue.Kerala's chief minister Pinarayi Vijayan presented an Aranmula mirror to King Hamad of Bahrain during a visit there in 2017.

The British Museum in London has an Aranmula mirror 45 centimeters tall in its collection. The mirrors received a geographical indication (GI) tag in 2004-05.

See also 
 Aranmula Kottaram
 Bronze mirror
 Speculum metal

References

Bibliography

External links 
 Aranmulakannadi.org
 

Mirrors
Culture of Pathanamthitta district
Geographical indications in Kerala
Indian metalwork
Aranmula